The following highways are numbered 693:

United States
Florida
  Florida State Road 693

Kentucky
 

Territories
  Puerto Rico Highway 693